Lithopoma brevispina is a species of sea snail, a marine gastropod mollusk in the family Turbinidae, the turban snails.

Description
The size of the shell varies between 40 mm and 60 mm. The imperforate, solid shell has a turbinate shape. The 6-7 whorls 6- are, flat above, obliquely costate below the sutures, then with several revolving series of granules. The periphery is sharply carinate, armed with short triangular spines which festoon the sutures and project more or less, about 10–13 in number on the body whorl. The base of the shell is a little rounded, radiately lamellose striate and concentrically lirate with three to five lirae, mostly tuberculate, especially in the young. The oval aperture is transverse, channelled at its outer angle. The short columella is arched. The place of the umbilicus is excavated, whitish, bounded by an intensely orange vermillion tract.

Distribution
This marine species occurs off Mexico to Colombia and off the Virgin Islands, found at depths of about 10 m.

References

 Lamarck, [J. B.] 1822. Histoire naturelle des animaux sans vertèbres. Histoire Naturelle des Animaux sans Vertèbres 7: [iii] + 711 pp. Author: Paris.
 Philippi, R. A. 1850. Diagnosen mehrerer neuer Trochus-Arten. Zeitschrift für Malakozoologie 6: 146–160.
 Weisbord, N. E. 1962. Late Cenozoic gastropods from northern Venezuela. Bulletins of American Paleontology 42(193): 672 pp., 48 pls.
 Alf A. & Kreipl K. (2011) The family Turbinidae. Subfamilies Turbininae Rafinesque, 1815 and Prisogasterinae Hickman & McLean, 1990. In: G.T. Poppe & K. Groh (eds), A Conchological Iconography. Hackenheim: Conchbooks. pp. 1–82, pls 104–245.

External links
 To World Register of Marine Species
 

brevispina
Gastropods described in 1822